The 2016 World RX of Latvia was the tenth round of the third season of the FIA World Rallycross Championship and the eighth round of the forty-first season of the FIA European Rallycross Championship. The event was the first FIA World or European rallycross event to be staged in Latvia, and was held at the Biķernieku Kompleksā Sporta Bāze, former host of the non-championship Latvian Grand Prix.

Supercar

Heats

Semi-finals
Semi-Final 1

Semi-Final 2

Final

RX Lites

Heats

Semi-finals
Semi-Final 1

Semi-Final 2

Final

Standings after the event

Supercar standings

RX Lites standings

 Note: Only the top five positions are included.

References

External links

|- style="text-align:center"
|width="35%"|Previous race:2016 World RX of Barcelona
|width="40%"|FIA World Rallycross Championship2016 season
|width="35%"|Next race:2016 World RX of Germany
|- style="text-align:center"
|width="35%"|Previous race:None
|width="40%"|World RX of Latvia
|width="35%"|Next race:2017 World RX of Latvia
|- style="text-align:center"

Latvia
2016 in Latvian sport
October 2016 sports events in Europe